Cushaw (or kershaw) is a common name for a winter squash with a curved neck.  It may refer to:

Cucurbita argyrosperma (syn. Cucurbita mixta), the species most commonly associated with "cushaw", which includes the green-striped cushaw and the white cushaw
Cucurbita moschata, the species that includes the golden cushaw and the orange-striped cushaw